Daniel Dutton (born 1959 near Somerset, Kentucky) is a contemporary artist, lyricist, composer, artistic director, and amateur filmmaker, whose work combines visual, musical, and narrative arts. He is best known for his first opera, The Stone Man.

During the 1980s, Dutton showed visual and video installation art at the  J. B. Speed Art Museum in Louisville, Kentucky. The Speed Museum commissioned two video works from Dutton: A Day in the Life of the Artist, and Water; an installed environment. Dutton's work was featured as a one-man show in the rotunda of the US Congressional Office Building in 1985.

In 1990, Kentucky Opera premiered Dutton's first opera, The Stone Man, at the Kentucky Center for the Arts.  The Stone Man was followed by a four-part cycle of dance operas titled The Secret Commonwealth.  These four operas; The Changeling and the Bear, The Road, Love and Time, and The Approach of the Mystery, were staged between 1995 and 2000. The first three operas were filmed and broadcast by Kentucky Educational Television.

Dutton's visual art work is displayed in the corporate art collections of the Brown-Forman Corporation, Louisville, KY and the LeBlond Machino company in Cincinnati. Also, they can be seen at the Berea College Art Museum, Berea, Kentucky, and the 21c Museum, Louisville, KY.

In 2003, Dutton was commissioned to paint a set of 12 scenes from traditional ballads by 21c Museum Hotels, Louisville, Kentucky. The paintings, along with a book and Dutton's recordings of traditional ballads, are complementary aspects of a project titled Ballads of the Barefoot Mind, which were displayed at 21c Museum in the Fall of 2006.

In 2016, Dutton partnered with welder / artist Jesse Rivera to form Rivera-Dutton Sculpture Studio.

Daniel Dutton lives in Somerset, Kentucky. Dutton is one of the last descendants still residing in Somerset of the Dutton family whose property was the site of the Civil War Battle of Dutton Hill (also known as the Battle of Somerset). His studio is less than 1/4 mile from the Battle of Dutton's Hill Monument.

References

Other sources
Tagami, Ty, "MUSICAL AMBASSADOR - MAKER OF RARE JAPANESE LUTE WILL PLAY IN SOMERSET" , Lexington Herald, 20 February 1999. p. A1: "Ohashi came to Somerset to visit friends and to perform with local artist Daniel Dutton, whom he met in Japan two years ago. Dutton traveled to Japan in 1997 with a Japanese couple living in Somerset, playing old Appalachian ballads on dulcimer and guitar for a Japanese audience. Dutton, who is the artistic director and musical composer for the opera, invited Ohashi to come to Kentucky and open the show."
Unk, "'SECRET' GETTING EASIER TO FIGURE OUT", Lexington Herald, 14 February 1999, p. J3: "Daniel Dutton hopes people will leave the world premiere of Love & Time - the third in his series of four opera-modern dance productions called The Secret Commonwealth saying: "I kind of understand what was happening there." The Somerset-based director/composer knows he has tested audiences with the first two chapters: The Changeling and the Bear and The Road.

External links
 
 Rivera-Dutton Sculpture Studio
 Art Appreciation and the Poetics of Space (Kentucky School of Art)
 Review of Love & Time by CD universe
 Ballads of the Barefoot Mind Exhibition at 21c Museum
 21c Museum book of Ballads of the Barefoot Mind
 21c Museum website
 Speed Art Museum website

American male classical composers
American classical composers
21st-century classical composers
1959 births
Living people
People from Pulaski County, Kentucky
Artists from Kentucky
Musicians from Kentucky
21st-century American composers
21st-century American male musicians